Stephen Paea (born May 11, 1988) is a New Zealand–born former American football defensive tackle. He played college football for Oregon State University, and was recognized as a consensus All-American.  He was drafted by the Chicago Bears in the second round of the 2011 NFL Draft, and has also played for the Washington Redskins, Cleveland Browns, and Dallas Cowboys.

Early years
Born in Auckland, New Zealand, Paea grew up in Vavaʻu, Tonga, where he played high school rugby union and dreamt of playing at Number 8 for the All Blacks. When he was 16, his family moved to the United States, initially to Lawrence, Kansas, where his cousin Chris Maumalanga was playing for the Kansas Jayhawks.  After a year, they moved to Provo, Utah, where Paea attended Timpview High School. Playing defensive line at only 240 pounds, he drew little attention by Division I schools, so he decided to enroll at nearby Snow College in Ephraim. Paea was also the state runner-up in the shot put, with a top-throw of 16.09 meters (52′08″) and a state qualifier in the discus with a best of 46.72 meters (153′03″).

After redshirting his initial year at Snow, he added more than 20 pounds to his frame and started the 2007 season as the No. 2 tackle on the depth chart. Finally drawing the attention of major schools, he transferred to Oregon State in mid-season after graduating from Snow with an associate degree in December 2007.

College career

Paea attended Oregon State University, where he played for the Oregon State Beavers football team from 2008 to 2010.  Making an immediate impact for the Beavers, Paea played in all 13 games, starting 12 of them, and recorded 41 tackles, 11 for a loss, and five quarterback sacks.  He was selected to College Football News′ All-Sophomore Second Team and was an honorable mention All-Pac-10 selection.

As a junior, Paea registered a team-leading 8.5 tackles for loss and was co-leader for sacks with three. He was named All-Pacific-10 First Team and received the Morris Trophy for the best defensive lineman in the conference.

Paea was invited to the 2011 Senior Bowl, but tore the lateral meniscus in his right knee on the opening practice, causing him to miss the remainder of the event.

Paea was a nominee for the Bill Hayward Athlete of the Year Award at the 2011 Oregon Sports Awards.

Professional career
At the 2011 NFL Combine, Paea set an official record of 49 repetitions in the 225-pound bench press.

Chicago Bears

Paea was selected with the 53rd overall pick in the second round of the 2011 NFL Draft by the Chicago Bears. On July 29, 2011, he signed a 4-year contract with the Chicago Bears.

In a Sunday Night Football game on October 16 against the Minnesota Vikings, as well as his NFL debut, Paea sacked Donovan McNabb in the end zone for a safety, being the first Bears player to record a safety in his debut since at least 1970.

In 2012, Paea and Nick Roach were awarded the Brian Piccolo Award.

After the 2012 NFL Draft, Paea was reunited with Oregon State teammate Brandon Hardin.

During the preseason, Paea injured his left ankle during a workout but started in the season opener against the Indianapolis Colts.

Washington Redskins
On March 10, 2015, Paea signed a four-year contract with the Washington Redskins, to play defensive end in their 3-4 defense. On December 11, the team placed him on injured reserve with a Grade 2 toe sprain. He appeared in 11 games (one start), registering 19 tackles and 1.5 sacks. He was released by the team on August 30, 2016.

Cleveland Browns
On September 2, 2016, the Cleveland Browns signed Paea as a free agent to play defensive end and provide depth on the defensive line. He appeared in 13 games, registering 12 tackles and a half-sack.

Dallas Cowboys
On March 10, 2017, Paea signed a one-year contract with the Dallas Cowboys, to help replace defensive tackle Terrell McClain who left in free agency. He also reunited with Rod Marinelli who was his defensive coordinator with the Chicago Bears. Although he battled a degenerative knee condition, he had a strong showing in the preseason and earned the starting position at defensive tackle, which gave the team the confidence to release Cedric Thornton. The knee injury would not improve and kept him out of practice since the first week of the regular season. He still managed to start 4 games, posting 7 tackles (2 for loss) and one quarterback pressure. On October 11, he decided to inform the team that he would be retiring from the NFL. He was placed on the injured reserve list on October 13.

References

External links

Oregon State Beavers bio
Chicago Bears bio
Washington Redskins bio

1988 births
Living people
All-American college football players
American football defensive ends
American football defensive tackles
Chicago Bears players
Cleveland Browns players
Dallas Cowboys players
New Zealand emigrants to the United States
New Zealand sportspeople of Tongan descent
New Zealand players of American football
Oregon State Beavers football players
People from Los Altos, California
Rugby union players that played in the NFL
Sportspeople from Auckland
Sportspeople from Santa Clara County, California
Tongan emigrants to the United States
Tongan players of American football
Washington Redskins players
Snow Badgers football players
Brian Piccolo Award winners